Gibbula cicer is a species of sea snail, a marine gastropod mollusk in the family Trochidae, the top snails.

Description
The size of an adult shell varies between 5 mm and 8 mm. The solid, globose-conical shell is perforate or subperforate. It is longitudinally crossed by reddish or dark brown stripes, often broken into tessellations on the base. There are five, convex whorls. The first two are yellow or rosy and smooth. The rest are coarsely spirally lirate with 6 or 7 lirae on the penultimate whorl. The lirae are separated by deep interstices which sometimes intersect  the colored stripes. The spire is short. The body whorl is rounded. The base of the shell is convex and finely marked with about eight narrow lirae with its base frequently suffused with pink. The arcuate columella is straightened in the middle and oblique and very subdentate below. The white or yellowish umbilical area is small.

(Description of Gibbula gaudiosa) The height of the shell attains 5.6 mm, its diameter 5.7 mm. The moderately elevated shell has a helicoid shape. It is red, with four regularly spaced triangular sectors of greenish yellow, on the last turn and one on the whorl preceding this. The cords of the early turns are of the most intense red, equaling the base in the brilliancy of this color. The 1½ nuclear whorls arewhite. The four postnuclear whorls are well rounded, the first and second marked by four equal, and equally spaced, strong, spiral keels. On the third, a fine, intercalated thread occurs between the strong cords, while on the last turn the number of fine spiral threads between the strong cords is doubled. In addition to the above sculpture, the spire is marked by rather strong, closely spaced, retractive incremental lines. The sutures are strongly impressed. The periphery of the body whorl is rendered strongly angulated by the fourth strong spiral cord. The base of the shell is short, well rounded, and marked by 15 almost equal and equally spaced, well-rounded, spiral cords. The oblique aperture is subcircular. The outer lip is thin at the edge where it is rendered sinuous by the strong spiral cords. The columella  is moderately stout and well curved. The parietal wall is covered with a thin callus.

Distribution
This marine species occurs off Namibia and North Transkei (South Africa)

References

 Kilburn, R.N. & Rippey, E. (1982) Sea Shells of Southern Africa. Macmillan South Africa, Johannesburg, xi + 249 pp. page(s): 40
 Trew, A., 1984. The Melvill-Tomlin Collection. Part 30. Trochacea. Handlists of the Molluscan Collections in the Department of Zoology, National Museum of Wales.
 Steyn, D.G. & Lussi, M. (1998) Marine Shells of South Africa. An Illustrated Collector’s Guide to Beached Shells. Ekogilde Publishers, Hartebeespoort, South Africa, ii + 264 pp. page(s): 18 
 Branch, G.M. et al. (2002). Two Oceans. 5th impression. David Philip, Cate Town & Johannesburg

External links
 

cicer
Gastropods described in 1844